The Massachusetts Bay Transportation Authority (MBTA) operates 152 bus routes in the Greater Boston area. The MBTA has a policy objective to provide transit service within walking distance (defined as ) for all residents living in areas with population densities greater than  within the MBTA's service district. Much of this service is provided by bus.

Most MBTA bus routes are local service operated in Boston and its inner suburbs and connect to MBTA subway stations. Fifteen high-ridership local routes are designated as key routes, with higher frequency at all operating hours. The MBTA operates a five-route bus rapid transit service branded as the Silver Line, as well as two limited-stop crosstown routes. Three smaller local networks are based in the nearby cities of Lynn, Waltham, and Quincy. Several express routes operate from suburbs to downtown Boston.

The MBTA has an active bus fleet around 1,140 buses with diesel-electric hybrid or compressed natural gas propulsion. Several Silver Line routes use dual-mode buses that operate as trolleybuses in the Waterfront Tunnel and as diesel buses on the surface. Replacement of the full fleet with battery electric buses is planned. The entire bus system is accessible; all vehicles are low-floor buses with fold-out ramps.

Most routes are operated directly by the MBTA. Five suburban routes are run by private operators under contract to the MBTA, while several small circulator systems are run by other operators with partial MBTA subsidy. MBTA-operated buses operate from nine garages, one of which is under reconstruction and a second planned for replacement. Several sections of dedicated right-of-way for MBTA buses have been opened in the 21st century, including two off-street busways for the Silver Line and a number of dedicated bus lanes.

The modern bus system descends from a network of horsecar and electric streetcar lines built in the 1850s to 1910s, which were consolidated under the West End Street Railway and later Boston Elevated Railway (BERy). The BERy introduced buses in 1922 to replace lightly-used streetcar lines and expand into new areas. Over the next four decades under the BERy and Metropolitan Transit Authority (MTA), all but six streetcar routes were converted to bus or trolleybus. (Most trolleybuses were phased out by the 1960s, but four routes lasted until 2022.) The MBTA took over the MTA in 1964, and several private suburban bus operators over the following two decades. Many routes have been modified during the MBTA era; the agency introduced crosstown routes in 1994 and the Silver Line in 2002.

History

A number of horsecar lines were built in Boston and surrounding towns in the second half of the 19th century, beginning with the Cambridge Railroad in 1856. Several smaller companies were consolidated into the West End Street Railway in 1887. The West End began electrifying existing lines and constructing new streetcar lines; the last horsecar lines ended in 1900. The West End was purchased in 1897 by the Boston Elevated Railway (BERy), which had been created to build a rapid transit system in Boston. As that system was constructed in the first two decades of the 20th century, many streetcar lines were cut back from downtown Boston to rapid transit stations.

Some small companies operated buses in Boston as early as the 1910s. BERy bus service began on February 23, 1922, when buses replaced the North Beacon Street streetcar line. Initial bus routes largely replaced lightly-used streetcar lines or expanded service to new areas. The BERy also attempted in the 1920s to make the Tremont Street streetcar subway operate more like a rapid transit line, using trains of streetcars entering the subway from a small number of feeder lines, rather than single streetcars from numerous surface lines. The Harvard–Lechmere streetcar line was converted to trackless trolley (trolleybus) on April 11, 1936 – the first route in what would become an extensive trackless trolley system.

As increased automobile usage reduced ridership and increased congestion, the BERy and its 1947 replacement Metropolitan Transit Authority (MTA) continued to convert streetcar lines to bus and trolleybus. Most trolleybus lines were replaced by buses in the late 1940s to early 1960s, as buses offered increased flexibility and no need to maintain overhead lines. When the Massachusetts Bay Transportation Authority (MBTA) replaced the MTA in 1964, all surface lines were operated by buses except six streetcar lines (the five Green Line branches plus the Mattapan Line) and four trolleybus lines. The MBTA rebranded many elements of Boston's public transportation network in its first decade. After being found unsuitable in 1965 for the Orange Line because it did not show up well on maps, yellow was chosen for the color of bus operations on January 8, 1972.

The MBTA had primarily been formed to subsidize the suburban commuter rail network. However, the agency also took over unprofitable suburban bus operations – much of which was former streetcar lines – from several private companies. The MBTA took over the Eastern Massachusetts Street Railway in 1968, inheriting large networks based in Lynn and Quincy plus several lines in Norwood and Melrose. (Networks serving Lowell, Lawrence, and Brockton outside the MBTA district were briefly operated by the MBTA. They were transferred to new public agencies: the LRTA in Lowell in 1976, a predecessor of the MVRTA in Lawrence in 1968, and a predecessor of the BAT in Brockton in 1969.) The MBTA began subsidizing Middlesex and Boston Street Railway service based in Newton and Waltham in 1964, and took over the remaining routes in 1972. Five former Service Bus Lines routes in northeast suburbs were taken over in 1975, and a single Brush Hill Transportation line in Milton was taken over in 1980.

The geographic scope of the MBTA bus network has remained relatively constant since these additions, though many services have been created, discontinued, and modified during the MBTA era. The openings of new sections of the Red Line (1971, 1980, 1984–85) and the Orange Line (1975–77, 1987) have resulted in significant changes as routes were modified to serve new transfer stations. Three limited-stop crosstown routes were created in 1994 as a prelude to the Urban Ring Project, a never-implemented circumferential bus rapid transit (BRT) corridor. Silver Line BRT service began in 2002 with conversion of existing bus service on Washington Street, and was expanded in 2004–05 with new routes serving the Waterfront Tunnel in the Seaport District. A second Silver Line service using the Washington Street corridor was added in 2009, and service from the Waterfront Tunnel to  began in 2018 with a new surface busway in Chelsea.

The BERy and MTA operated overnight Owl service until 1960. From September 2001 to June 2005, the MBTA operated bus service on 17 routes (7 normal bus routes and 10 routes replicating subway lines) until 2:30am on Friday and Saturday nights. Similar service on the key routes was operated from March 2013 to March 2014. In 2017, the MBTA Board rejected a proposal to run all-night service on several routes with pulsed connections at a central hub.

In 2022, the MBTA started cutting bus service due to a driver shortage resulting from a long-term retirement trend accelerated by the COVID-19 pandemic in Massachusetts. Despite paying for training to get a commercial driver's license and offering a $4,500 signing bonus, it ended the year short about 350 drivers, plus about 400 more needed to increase service to implement a proposed bus network redesign. Experts said the shortage was caused by the failure to raise the starting hourly wage, and offer new hires full-time work instead of forcing all of them to start part-time. Drivers were also unhappy about lack of access to bathrooms and "split shifts" with unpaid time between morning and evening rush hour that was too short to go home.

Fleet

Active fleet
This is the current bus roster for the MBTA .

Future

The MBTA began a phased 500-bus order in 2021, with delivery from 2022–2026. Under that plan, the agency would establish a continuous procurement process with 100 new buses per year, and buses retired after 12 years.

Facilities

MBTA buses are operated out of eight facilities. The MBTA plans to replace Quincy Garage with a larger facility near Quincy Adams station. The parcel was purchased for $38.2 million in March 2021. Bids in May 2022 came in higher than expected – $360 million versus $280 million – prompting the MBTA to switch to Construction Management at Risk bidding for the project. A replacement of Arborway Garage on-site is planned for 2027. In July 2022, the MBTA indicated plans to purchase an adjacent parcel to expand Southampton Garage.

Private buses

Most local bus routes in Massachusetts outside the immediate MBTA operating area are operated by the state's other regional transit authorities (RTAs). However, some routes that connect with MBTA bus or subway service are operated by outside private contractors with partial subsidy by the MBTA.

The five routes are primarily commuter routes which connect with other MBTA services at their inbound terminals. They were taken over from various private operators (Hudson Bus Lines for the 710 and 716, Rapid Transit Inc. for the 712/713, and Nantasket Transportation for the 714). The 712 and 713 use MBTA-provided buses and accept Charliecards; the other routes do not.

Four suburban municipalities contract with outside operators for local circulator routes, most with partial MBTA subsidy. Bedford and Beverly run single routes, Burlington runs five routes, and Lexington runs six.  Most are run by private operators, except for the Beverly Shuttle, which is part of the Cape Ann Transportation Authority system.  Additionally, a nonprofit shuttle is run in Boston's Mission Hill neighborhood.  Those routes appear on MBTA system maps and connect with MBTA services at designated transfer points, but are numbered separately and do not accept MBTA passes.

Bus lanes

Several sections of dedicated right-of-way for MBTA buses have been opened in the 21st century. A direct ramp to the Ted Williams Tunnel is proposed for use by the SL1 and SL3.

A number of dedicated bus lanes on surface streets are also in use:
Washington Street, Boston: 
 between Melnea Cass Boulevard and Kneeland Street (including a short southbound contraflow section), with an additional  northbound-only between Stuart Street and Temple Place. The southern section was opened in 2002 with the introduction of Silver Line service; the portion north of Herald Street (northbound) and Marginal Street (southbound) was added in mid-2020 along with a lane on Temple Place.
Essex Street, Boston: Two eastbound segments totaling , opened in 2009 for use by the SL4.
Broadway, Sweetser Circle, and Main Street, Everett: A  morning-peak-only southbound bus lane on Broadway from Henry Street to Sweetser Circle (routes , 104, 109) was opened in 2017 after a 2016 test. A  northbound evening-peak-only lane on Broadway from Sweetser Circle to Chelsea Street, a  northbound evening-peak-only lane on Main Street from Sweetser Circle to Oakes Street (routes , 105), and an all-day lane around Sweetser Circle were added in October 2020.
Prospect Street, Somerville: a  northbound bus/bike lane (routes) opened in 2017.
Massachusetts Avenue, Cambridge and Arlington:  of southbound bus lane from Sidney Street to Memorial Drive for route , opened in November 2018.  of southbound morning-peak-only bus/bike lane from Varnum Street to Alewife Brook Parkway for route  was installed in October 2019 after a successful test a year before.  of bus lanes between Dudley Street and Alewife Brook Parkway (route 1) opened in November 2021.
Sullivan Square, Boston: Three short sections of bus-only turn lane on Beacham Street (routes , 91, CT2), Maffa Way, and Main Street for buses entering Sullivan Square station, installed as part of a 2018–2019 reconfiguration of the station.
The eastbound lane was opened in June 2019, followed by the westbound lane that October.
North Washington Street, Boston:  of southbound bus/bike lane (route 92, 93, and ) from Causeway Street to Beverly Street opened in August 2019. A  northbound bus lane from Sudbury Street to Causeway Street opened in August 2021.
Davis Square, Somerville: queue jumps on Holland Street (routes  and ) and College Avenue (89) opened in 2020.
Tobin Memorial Bridge:  of westbound bus lane for route 111 (a 12-month pilot) opened in December 2020.
Florence Street, Malden: a  westbound bus/bike lane opened in December 2020.
Washington Street, Somerville: a westbound bus/bike queue jump at McGrath Highway (routes ,) and queue jumps west of Union Square (route 86) were added in 2020-21.
North Common Street, South Common Street, and Market Street, Lynn:  of bus/bike lanes for routes / and  opened in April 2021.
Mystic Avenue, Somerville and Medford: a  pilot of a morning-peak-only southbound bus lane for route 95 opened in June 2021.
The lanes can be used during peak periods when traffic speeds are below .

Other funded projects include Western Avenue in Lynn between Ida Street and the Belden Bly Bridge, Lynnway in Lynn, Washington Street at Brookline Village, and Centre Street in downtown Malden. Center-running bus lanes are also proposed for Summer Street in the Seaport and Blue Hill Avenue between Grove Hall and

References

External links 

 MBTA – bus schedules and maps
 MBTA – Better Bus Project

MBTA bus
Bus transportation in the Boston area